The 1998 Davidoff Swiss Indoors was a men's tennis tournament played on indoor hard courts. It was the 29th edition of the event known that year as the Davidoff Swiss Indoors, and was part of the World Series of the 1998 ATP Tour. It took place at the St. Jakobshalle in Basel, Switzerland, from October 5 through October 11, 1998. Sixth-seeded Tim Henman won the singles title.

Finals

Singles

 Tim Henman defeated  Andre Agassi 6–4, 6–3, 3–6, 6–4<
 It was Henman's 2nd singles title of the year and the 4th of his career.

Doubles

 Olivier Delaître /  Fabrice Santoro defeated  Piet Norval /  Kevin Ullyett, 6–3, 7–6
 It was Delaître's 3rd title of the year and the 11th of his career. It was Santoro's 3rd title of the year and the 4th of his career.

References

External links
 Official website  
 Official website 
 ATP tournament profile

 
Davidoff Swiss Indoors
Swiss Indoors